Terry D. Johnston (born May 27, 1947) was an American politician and businesswoman.

Johnston went to University of North Dakota and was an insurance agent. She lived in Prior Lake, Minnesota with her husband and family. Johnston served in the Minnesota Senate from 1991 to 1996 and was a Republican.

References

1947 births
Living people
People from Prior Lake, Minnesota
University of North Dakota alumni
Businesspeople from Minnesota
Women state legislators in Minnesota
Republican Party Minnesota state senators